Overload is the second extended play by South Korean rock band Xdinary Heroes. It is released by Studio J and JYP Entertainment on November 11, 2022. The EP is the second release of the band in 2022. The extended play features six original tracks, including the lead single "Hair Cut".

Background and release 
On September 16, the band announced that they will release their second extended play Overload on November 4. A month later, on October 17 and 18, the band released spoiler images hinting the concept of their upcoming EP. On October 19, the promotional schedule was released. On October 22, the instrumental sampler video was released. On October 30, the highlight film was released. On October 30, JYP Entertainment announced the postponement of the album due to the national mourning period following the Itaewon Halloween crowd crush incident that happened a day earlier. On November 6, JYP Entertainment announced Overload would be released on November 11. The music video teasers for lead single "Hair Cut" was released on November 8 and 9. On November 11, the EP was released alongside with the music video for "Hair Cut".

Composition 
Overload consists of six original tracks written and composed by the band. As described by the band, Overload is an EP with deep rock sound with songs revolving in the theme "conflict from within". The lead single "Hair Cut," contains minimal bass riff and the lyrics "liken negative thoughts to hair and the willingness of the person to cut the darkness that blocks their vision". "Lunatic" is a song that "embodies the sense of justice that the world demands from heroes". Meanwhile, "Crack in the Mirror" is a rock song with lyrics about "looking at the multi-layered self and the confusion experienced during the process of growth". The fifth track "Ghost" is a song "that talks about the voices inside a person's head that made them doubt themselves". The last track "X-mas" depicts the "emotions and confusion felt when looking in the mirror".

Promotion 
On November 11, the band held a showcase for their new album as the start of their promotions for Overload.

Commercial performance 
Overload debuted at number five on South Korea's Circle Album Chart issue dated November 6-12, 2022. The EP also debuted at number 14 on the Billboard World Albums Chart.

Track listing

Charts

Weekly charts

Monthly charts

Sales

Release history

References 

2022 EPs
JYP Entertainment EPs
Korean-language EPs